Pardul (also Romanized as Pardūl, Pardool, and Pardowl; also known as Pardel, Pardol, Pardolī, Pardūli, Perdil, and Pordel) is a village in Rudqat Rural District, Sufian District, Shabestar County, East Azerbaijan Province, Iran. At the 2006 census, its population was 322, in 77 families.

References 

Populated places in Shabestar County